Zbigniew Marcin Bródka (born 8 October 1984) is a Polish speed skater and a 2014 Olympic champion in 1500 metres. He also works as a firefighter in the State Fire Service station in Łowicz.

Personal life
Bródka was born in Głowno, Poland, on 8 October 1984. Since 2009, he has worked as a firefighter in the State Fire Service station in Łowicz. He represents a local sports club, UKS Błyskawica Domaniewice. He is married to Agnieszka and has two daughters - Gabriela and Amelia.

Competitive career 
He often trains in Germany, as Poland lacks appropriate facilities for long track speed skating. When he trains in Poland, Bródka is forced to improvise, including using roller skates to imitate ice skating movements. In 2006, an accident prevented him from participating in the 2006 Winter Olympics. In 2010, he made his Olympic debut in Vancouver, finishing 27th in the men's 1500 metres. In the following years, he took part in several Polish and European championships, placing well and winning several competitions (a total of five gold medals until 2014) in Poland.

At the 2013 World Single Distance Championships, Bródka helped Poland capture the bronze medal in the men's team pursuit with teammates Jan Szymański and Konrad Niedźwiedzki. It was the first victory for Poland's male speed skaters in that discipline. In the 2012–13 season he also won the men's 1500 metres World Cup, the first Polish speed skater to do so.

At the 2014 Winter Olympics in Sochi, he became the 2014 Olympic champion in 1500 metres, winning by only 0.003 sec. He is the first Pole to receive a gold medal in this discipline.

He won the bronze medal at the 2018 European Speed Skating Championships in the Team pursuit event in Kolomna with his teammates Jan Szymański and Adrian Wielgat.

He was chosen to be the flagbearer of the Polish team at the 2018 Winter Olympic Games in Pyeongchang, same as at the 2022 Winter Olympics in Beijing.

Personal records

References

External links 
 

1984 births
Living people
Polish male speed skaters
Speed skaters at the 2010 Winter Olympics
Speed skaters at the 2014 Winter Olympics
Speed skaters at the 2018 Winter Olympics
Speed skaters at the 2022 Winter Olympics
Olympic speed skaters of Poland
Medalists at the 2014 Winter Olympics
Olympic medalists in speed skating
Olympic gold medalists for Poland
Olympic bronze medalists for Poland
Polish firefighters
Sportspeople from Łódź Voivodeship
People from Głowno
World Single Distances Speed Skating Championships medalists